Ali Insanov (born March 22, 1946, Lambali, Armenian SSR) was the Minister of Health of Azerbaijan from 1993–2005.

Life 
Insanov was detained in October, 2005. He was accused of attempting a coup d'etat and causing mass riots. At the decision of the Azerbaijani Court on Heinous Crimes on 20 April, Ali Insanov was found guilty of appropriation of property and abuse of power and sentenced to 11 years imprisonment. He is currently being detained at the Bail Isolation Cell 1 of the Penitentiary Service of Azerbaijan. He demands to be transferred to the Patient Care Institution of the Penitentiary Service. Medical examinations on him have proved that he suffers from a vertebral hernia.

References

External links

 Rovshan Ismayilov, Azerbaijan: Two More officials Sacked , Eurasianet, October 20, 2005, Accessed Dec. 14, 2006
 Ben Wetherall, Azerbaijan: President Aliyev Asserts His Authority on Eve of Parliamentary Elections, Global Insight, Accessed Dec. 14, 2006

Armenian Azerbaijanis
Azerbaijani politicians convicted of crimes
Azerbaijan Medical University alumni
1946 births
Living people
Azerbaijani inventors